Non Stop is the fifth studio album by Russian pop band Reflex.

Critical reception
According to the reviewer of the agency InterMedia gave the album a positive assessment. The reviewer called the songs It's Hard for Me to Speak, The Stars Fell, Because You Didn't Exist, and Acka Raga. By the hits of the album. According to him, most of the other songs are also not bad in their own way, but they need to get used to, listen to, and radio figures usually prefer to grab what lies on the surface.

Track listing

 Non Stop – 3:43  
 Может быть показалось – 3:50  (May Be Seemed) 
 Мне трудно говорить – 3:34  (It's Hard for Me to Speak) 
 Падали звёзды – 3:38  (The Stars Fell) 
 Зима – 3:42  (Winter) 
 Acka Raga – 3:37 
 Город плачет – 4:00  (City Crying) 
 Дельфин – 3:53  (Dolphin) 
 Потому что не было тебя – 3:17  (Because You Didn't Exist (Acoustic Version)  
 Я буду помнить  – 4:17  (I Will Remember) 
 Это Новый год! – 3:46  (It is a New Year!) 
 D.I.S.C.O. 2 – 3:58   feat.  DJ Silver 
 Мне трудно говорить – 3:55  (It's Hard for Me to Speak)   (Remix)
Acka Raga (Remix) – 3:30
 Потому что не было тебя – 5:28  (DJ Orl vs. Funkmaster Club Mix)

Personnel
 Irene Nelson — vocals, backing vocals
 Alyona Torganova — backing vocals
 Grigory Rozov (DJ Silver) — rap
 Anton Tyurin   — guitar, arrangement
 Andrey Slonchinsky  — guitar, arrangement
  — arrangement, production
 Anatoly Betskov — arrangement

References

External links
 Official website
 Non Stop at the Apple Music

2003 albums
Russian-language albums